Interface and colloid science is an interdisciplinary intersection of branches of chemistry, physics, nanoscience and other fields dealing with colloids, heterogeneous systems consisting of a mechanical mixture of particles between 1 nm and 1000 nm dispersed in a continuous medium. A colloidal solution is a heterogeneous mixture in which the particle size of the substance is intermediate between a true solution and a suspension, i.e. between 1–1000 nm. Smoke from a fire is an example of a colloidal system in which tiny particles of solid float in air. Just like true solutions, colloidal particles are small and cannot be seen by the naked eye. They easily pass through filter paper. But colloidal particles are big enough to be blocked by parchment paper or animal membrane.

Interface and colloid science has applications and ramifications in the chemical industry, pharmaceuticals, biotechnology, ceramics, minerals, nanotechnology, and microfluidics, among others.

There are many books dedicated to this scientific discipline,  and there is a glossary of terms, Nomenclature in Dispersion Science and Technology, published by the US National Institute of Standards and Technology.

See also
 Interface (matter)
 Electrokinetic phenomena
 Surface science

References

External links
 Max Planck Institute of Colloids and Interfaces
 American Chemical Society division of Colloid & Surface Chemistry

Chemical mixtures
Colloidal chemistry
Condensed matter physics